Escadrille 37 of the French Air Force was established at Chateauford, France in January 1915. Its original equipment of Morane-Saulniers led to its original designation of Escadrille MS 37.

History
Initially, Escadrille MS 37 was posted to support II Armee of the French Army. During July, it began the transition to Nieuport two-seaters which would lead to its being redubbed Escadrille N 37 on 20 September 1915. In Spring 1916, the escadrille converted to Nieuport 11s. On 2 July 1916, the unit was forwarded to support VI Armee. The ad hoc Groupement de Chasse de Cachy was there with its four assigned Escadrilles; N 37 and two other escadrilles were temporarily attached to the groupement.

In January 1917, Escadrille N.37 transferred to III Armee. In early March, it moved to IV Armee. At the same time, it began to rearm with SPADs; this would lead to its later redesignation as Escadrille SPA 37. In March, it was incorporated into alarger unit, Groupe de Combat 15. In July, Escadrille 37 was again posted to II Armee. In September, it returned briefly to IV Armee before once again being assigned to II Armee later in 1917.

As part of GC 15, Escadrille 37 joined in the groupe missions as it returned to support of IV Armee in mid-January 1918. The escadrille remained with GC 15 as the latter was incorporated into the larger Escadre de Combat No. 1 on 4 February 1918; subsequently that formation joined an even larger one, 1er Division Aerienne, on 14 May 1918.

On 4 October 1918, the Escadre and its constituent escadrilles were cited in orders. Escadrille SPA 37 was credited with 50 confirmed victories and 35 probables to date. Subsequent victories before war's end are unknown.

Escadrille 37 served in the French Air Force until disbandment on 29 June 2010.

Commanding officers
 Capitaine Louis Quillien: January 1915 - KIA 3 April 1916
 Lieutenant Marcel Feierstein: 4 April 1916 - 19 December 1917
 Capitaine Marcel Bonnevay: 20 December 1917 - 4 February 1918
 Lieutenant Paumier: 5 February 1918 - KIA 4 June 1918
 Lieutenant Roger Poupon: 5 June 1918 - ?

Notable personnel
 Adolphe Pegoud
 Bernard Barny de Romanet
 Fernand Guyou
 Roger Poupon
 Georges Lienhart
 Etienne Tsu

Aircraft inventory
 Morane-Saulnier two-seaters: January 1915
 Nieuport two-seaters: From July 1915
 Nieuport 11: Spring 1916
 SPAD: From March 1917

Endnotes

References 
 Franks, Norman; Frank W. Bailey. Over the Front: A Complete Record of the Fighter Aces and Units of the United States and French Air Services, 1914-1918 Grub Street, 1992. , .

Further reading 
 Bailey, Frank W., and Christophe Cony. French Air Service War Chronology, 1914-1918: Day-to-Day Claims and Losses by French Fighter, Bomber and Two-Seat Pilots on the Western Front. London: Grub Street, 2001.
 Davilla, James J., and Arthur M. Soltan. French Aircraft of the First World War. Stratford, CT: Flying Machines Press, 1997.
 Les escadrilles de l'aéronautique militaire française: symbolique et histoire, 1912-1920. Vincennes: Service historique de l'armée de l'air, 2004.

External links
Escadrille MS 37 - N 37 - SPA 37

French Air and Space Force squadrons